Edward Hallowell may refer to:

Edward Hallowell (herpetologist) (1808–1860), American herpetologist and physician
Edward Hallowell (psychiatrist) (born 1949), American psychiatrist known for his work on Attention-deficit hyperactivity disorder
Edward Needles Hallowell (1836–1871), officer in and later commander of the 54th Massachusetts Volunteer Infantry